John Morton Dykes (15 August 1877 – 12 October 1955) was a Scottish rugby union international who represented Scotland in the 1898, 1899, 1900, 1901 and 1902 Home Nations Championships.

Rugby Union career

Amateur career

Dykes played as a forward for Clydesdale RFC before moving to London Scottish and Glasgow HSFP.

Provincial career

Dykes also represented Glasgow District. He played in the 7 December 1901 inter-city match against Edinburgh District. Edinburgh won the match 9–3.

International career

Dykes played for the Scottish international rugby union side a total of 10 times (position: Forward), making his debut against Ireland on 18 February 1898 in Belfast. Scotland won the match 8–0; by 2 tries and a conversion. His last match was against England on 15 March 1902 at Inverleith. He was President of the Scottish Rugby Union from 1920 to 1922.

Refereeing career

Dykes refereed the 1919 Inter-City match between Glasgow and Edinburgh.

Administrative career

Dykes was President of the Scottish Rugby Union for the period 1920 to 1922.

Family

Dykes was born to parents James Dykes and Janet Wilson Murray aka 'Jessie' and had 3 brothers, Alexander, William and James; and 2 sisters, Agnes and Jessie. His brother William Dykes also played rugby union for Clydesdale and Glasgow District. His son, John Morton Dykes, was a noted amateur golfer who played in the 1936 Walker Cup and was the Scottish Amateur champion in 1951.
He was the uncle of the brothers, Andrew Dykes and James Dykes who were both Scottish Rugby Union Internationlists.

References

1877 births
1955 deaths
Scottish rugby union players
Scotland international rugby union players
Glasgow District (rugby union) players
Clydesdale RFC Glasgow rugby union players
London Scottish F.C. players
Glasgow HSFP players
Rugby union players from Glasgow
Scottish rugby union referees
Scottish Districts referees
Presidents of the Scottish Rugby Union